Material implication may refer to:
 Material conditional, a logical connective
 Material implication (rule of inference), a rule of replacement for some propositional logic

See also 
 Implication (disambiguation)
 Conditional statement (disambiguation)